An Ríocht GAC is a GAA (Gaelic Athletic Association) Club based in County Down, Northern Ireland. The club provides teams from underage level to adult level in both Gaelic football and camogie. The club is one of 47 in Down GAA.

The club is based in the Mournes just outside Kilkeel at Dunavil Road.

The club today 
An Ríocht GAC is one of the main clubs in County Down today. The club has camogie teams and football teams at Under-8, Under-10, Under-12, Under-14, Under-16, Minor, Seconds, Thirds, Under-21 and Senior Level as well as a youth club. The youth club goes under the name of The Kingdom Youth Club.

The Senior Football team are in Division 2 and play in the Down Senior Football Championship. An Ríocht is regularly represented on Down GAA teams. In 2010 three An Ríocht players started on the Down team which lost the All-Ireland Final to Cork - Brendan McVeigh, Martin Clarke and John Clarke, while James Colgan was a member of the 2010 Down panel. Brendan McVeigh and Martin Clarke also picked up GAA GPA All Stars Awards in 2010.
The club is currently managed jointly by former captain Deaglan O'Reilly & Edmund Kali.

Recent Notable Players
 Brendan McVeigh, former Down goalkeeper and 2010 All Star
 James Colgan, former Down footballer and 2005 All Ireland winning Minor Captain
 Mike Quinn, former Down footballer All Ireland medal winner 1991, Sigerson Cup Winner with Queen's in 1990
 Gerard Colgan, former Down footballer and All Ireland medal winner 1994
 John Clarke, former Down footballer
 Martin Clarke, former Australian rules football with Collingwood & Down player
 Daniel Flynn, former Down footballer and Sigerson Cup winner with UCD
 Gary Cunningham, former Down footballer
 John Lavery, former Down footballer

See also 
 Down Senior Club Football Championship
 List of Gaelic Athletic Association clubs

External links 
 An Riocht GAA Club website
 Down GAA County website

Gaelic football clubs in County Down
Gaelic games clubs in County Down